The Institute of the Motor Industry is the professional body for individuals working in the motor industry, internationally. IMI is the authoritative source of retail industry information, standards and qualifications. IMI plays a vital role in developing and maintaining a skilled, competent and professional workforce, able to keep pace with evolving automotive technologies and rapidly changing markets.

‘IMI believes that the development and facilitation of professional registration is critical to personal and business success.
IMI exists to make this happen.’

In 2013, IMI launched the Professional Register. The Register lists individuals such as vehicle technicians and sales representatives in the automotive industry who have been recognised for their experience, professionalism and commitment to ethical working practices, and for continually keeping their knowledge and skills up to date with the latest training from the industry. Professionals in the motor industry, aspire to join the Professional Register. Specifically, IMI Techsafe refers to the register devoted to those technicians who meet the professional standards for Electrified Vehicles.

On 28 October 2020, the IMI announced that it had appointed Professor Jim Saker as its new president. It also announced that  Linda Jackson and Sandy Burgess were its new vice-presidents. They also confirmed Kevin Finn as chairman and Tony Tomsett as honorary treasurer.

IMI Accreditation (Previously ATA) 

IMI Accreditations previously known as Automotive Technician Accreditation (ATA) is a UK Based voluntary scheme which tests the current competence of people working in the retail motor industry. Typically IMI accreditations are valid for 3 years before they must be renewed.

ATA was established in 2005 by the IMI and incorporates 16 automotive disciplines. Each route content and structure are frequently reviewed to ensure they remain relevant and current to support the skills need in the sector.

ATA was rebranded as IMI Accreditation in December 2014 as a bigger part of an IMI rebranding.

References 

1920 establishments in the United Kingdom
Automobile associations in the United Kingdom
Automotive industry in the United Kingdom
East Hertfordshire District
Engineering education in the United Kingdom
Organisations based in Hertfordshire
Organizations established in 1920